Hinson is an unincorporated community in Gadsden County, Florida, United States. It is located along U.S. Route 27 in the vicinity of Potter-Woodbury Road north of Havana, Florida.

References

Unincorporated communities in Gadsden County, Florida
Tallahassee metropolitan area
Unincorporated communities in Florida